Alfred Hitchcock's Anthology (AHA) was a seasonally printed collection of suspenseful and thrilling short stories reprinted from Alfred Hitchcock's Mystery Magazine. Produced from 1977 to 1989, the anthology contains stories from authors such as: Patricia Highsmith, Robert Bloch, Bill Pronzini, Isaac Asimov, and Lawrence Block. The anthology is marketed as everything you would "expect from the Master of Suspense", though Hitchcock never had any direct involvement with the publications.

Selected volumes
Alfred Hitchcock's Anthology – Volume 1
Alfred Hitchcock's Anthology – Volume 2
Alfred Hitchcock's Anthology – Volume 3
Alfred Hitchcock's Anthology – Volume 4
Alfred Hitchcock's Anthology – Volume 5

External links
 Alfred Hitchcock's Anthology List

Alfred Hitchcock
Annual magazines published in the United States
Defunct literary magazines published in the United States
Magazines established in 1977
Magazines disestablished in 1989
Magazines published in New York City
Mystery fiction magazines
Mystery fiction digests
Works originally published in Alfred Hitchcock's Mystery Magazine